Emanuel Quartsin Gyasi (born 11 January 1994) is a professional footballer who serves as captain and plays as a forward for Serie A club Spezia. Born in Italy, he represents the Ghana national team.

Career
Gyasi made his Serie C debut for Pisa on 17 September 2014 in a game against Savona.

International career
Gyasi debuted for the Ghana national team in a 1–1 2021 Africa Cup of Nations qualification tie with South Africa on 25 March 2021.

References

External links
 

1994 births
Living people
Footballers from Palermo
Citizens of Ghana through descent
Ghanaian footballers
Ghana international footballers
Italian footballers
Italian people of Ghanaian descent
Italian sportspeople of African descent
Association football forwards
Torino F.C. players
Pisa S.C. players
Mantova 1911 players
Carrarese Calcio players
U.S. Pistoiese 1921 players
Spezia Calcio players
F.C. Südtirol players
Serie A players
Serie B players
Serie C players